West Philippine Sea (abbreviated as WPS) is the official designation by the government of the Philippines to the parts of the South China Sea that are included in the country's exclusive economic zone. The term is also sometimes incorrectly used to refer to the entire South China Sea.

Background 
The first use of the term "West Philippine Sea" by the Philippine national government was as early as 2011, during the administration of President Benigno Aquino III. The naming was intended for purposes of the national mapping system and to symbolize disagreement with China's sovereignty claim over the whole South China Sea.

In the House of Representatives, Akbayan representative Walden Bello filed a resolution in June 2011 urging the government to look into the process of changing the name of the South China Sea to "Western Philippine Sea". The proposal to have a different naming for the sea has received support from the Armed Forces of the Philippines, which has been using West Philippine Sea since the mid-2000s That was codified by administrative order in September 2012, and its application clarified as limited to waters within the Philippine Exclusive Economic Zone (EEZ), which mandated use of that term by departments, subdivisions, agencies and instrumentalities of the Philippine government. The Philippine government then announced that it would start using the name to refer to waters west of the Philippines as "West Philippine Sea" in government maps, other forms of communication and documents.

In September 2012, the Philippine government announced that it would start using the name to refer to waters west of the Philippines as "West Philippine Sea" in government maps, other forms of communication and documents.

2016 PCA ruling 

On July 12, 2016, the Permanent Court of Arbitration ruled in favor of the Philippines in a case not involving naming. It clarified that "[T]he Tribunal has not been asked to, and does not purport to, delimit any maritime boundary between the
Parties or involving any other State bordering on the South China Sea". The tribunal also ruled that China has "no historical rights" based on the "nine-dash line" map.

Legal scope 
There is no exact demarcation of boundaries for the area in the South China Sea which forms the West Philippine Sea. The Administrative order which officially named the area defined it as follows:

In Philippine law, the West Philippine Sea refers only to the portions of the South China Sea which the Philippine government claims to be part of the country's exclusive economic zone (EEZ). The naming of the area became official through Administrative Order No. 29 issued by then-President Benigno Aquino III on September 5, 2012. The order also cites Presidential Decree No. 1599 which was issued in 1978 during the tenure of then President Ferdinand Marcos which established the Philippine EEZ as well as the Republic Act No. 9522 or the Baselines Law which was enacted into law in 2009 during the administration of then-President Gloria Macapagal Arroyo which delineated the baselines of the Philippine archipelago.

The administrative order asserts the Philippine claim over its EEZ in the South China Sea which conveys the Philippine government's position that it has sovereign rights under the 1982 United Nations Convention on the Law of the Sea over the West Philippine Sea area and "inherent power and right to designate its maritime areas with appropriate nomenclature for purposes of the national mapping system".

Usage 
Under the Administrative Order No. 29, the National Mapping and Resource Information Authority is mandated to use the designation West Philippine Sea in maps produced and published by the government agency. Other government agencies are also required to use the term to popularize the use of the name domestically and internationally.

Prior to the issuance of the order, the Philippines' weather bureau, PAGASA, adopted the name in 2011 to refer to waters west of the country while remained using "Philippine Sea" to refer waters east of the archipelago.

The term "West Philippine Sea" has sometimes been incorrectly used to refer to whole South China Sea.

See also 
 Exclusive economic zone of the Philippines
 Natuna Sea

References 

Geographical naming disputes
Politics of the Philippines
South China Sea
Territorial disputes of the Philippines